Pavle Čortanović (5 February 1830, in Novi Sad, then Habsburg monarchy, now Serbia – 31 March 1903, in Belgrade, Serbia) was a Serbian painter. Pavle was the son and student of Petar Čortanović. Pavle also studied art at the Vienna Academy of Fine Arts from 1845 until the winter semester of 1852-1853.

He was the author of many icons that grace the sanctuary screens (iconostasis) of Serbian Orthodox churches in Vojka (1859), Vasica (1863), Bodegraj (1885), and also in Besenov, Ravanica, Grabovo, Stara Pazova, Veliki Radinci, Berkasovo, Ruma, Lalić and other places. He also authored a portrait of Miloš Obrenović, prince and ruler of the Principality of Serbia.

Works by Pavle Čortanović can be found in art galleries and museums throughout the country. Also, Čortanović's work can be found in the collection of Milan Jovanović Stojimirović who bequeathed a large number of paintings, sketches, and artifacts to the Art Department of the Museum in Smederevo.

See also
List of painters from Serbia
Serbian art

References 

1830 births
1903 deaths
19th-century Serbian painters
Serbian male painters
19th-century Serbian male artists